is a Japanese professional kickboxer, currently competing in the welterweight divisions of RISE and NJKF. He is the current RISE welterweight champion.

As of April 2022, Combat Press ranks him as the tenth best super featherweight kickboxer in the world.

Martial arts career

NJKF

Early NJKF career
Nakano was booked to face Takaya Donhie at NJKF 2018 west 3rd on May 27, 2018. He won the fight by a third-round technical knockout. He move up a weight class to welterweight for his next bout, against Jun Da Lion at NJKF WEST Young Fight 4th on August 19, 2018. He won the fight by unanimous decision, with all three judges scoring the fight 30–27 for him. Nakano briefly moved away from NJKF for his next fight, as he faced Kazuki Hamasaki at Hoost Cup Kings Osaka 3 on October 28, 2018. He won the fight by a third-round technical knockout, as Hamasaki's corner threw in the towel at the 0:31 minute mark.

NJKF welterweight champion
His three-fight winning streak earned Nakano the opportunity to challenge the reigning NJFK welterweight champion TETSURO at NJKF 2018 West 4th on December 16, 2018. He won the fight by a dominant unanimous decision, with all three judges scoring the bout 50–44 in his favor. Nakano knocked the champion down with a right hook in the second round and cut him with an elbow in the fourth round, after which the ringside physician was called in to check on TETSURO.

Nakano faced the one-time Rajadamnern Stadium and Lumpinee Stadium champion Pakorn P.K. Saenchai Muaythaigym in the co-main event of The Battle Of Muay Thai Season 2 vol.1 on April 14, 2019. He lost the fight by a second-round low kick knockout.

Nakano faced Yuya at RISE WORLD SERIES 2019 Semi-Final Round in OSAKA on July 21, 2019. He won the fight by a first-round knockout, stopping Yuya with a left hook.

Nakano faced Kyung Jae Cho in a non-title bout at NJKF 2019 West 4th on September 22, 2019. He lost the fight by unanimous decision. Nakano faced Hayato Hatakeyama for the S-1 Japan super lightweight title at NJKF 2019 4th on November 30, 2019. He won the fight by a second-round technical knockout.

Nakano made his second RISE appearance against the RISE Super Lightweight champion Kosei Yamada in a non-title bout at RISE 137 on February 23, 2020. He lost his first fight of the year by unanimous decision, with scores of 30–29, 30–29, 30–28. Nakano made his second RISE appearance in his second and last fight of the year, against Hiroto Yamaguchi at RISE DEAD OR ALIVE2020 Osaka on November 1, 2020. He won the fight by majority decision, with scores of 29–28, 28–28 and 30–28.

RISE

Early RISE career
Nakano, at the time the time the #1 ranked WBC Muaythai Japan welterweight contender, was booked to face Yuya Yamato for the vacant WBC Muaythai title at Yamato Gym 50th Anniversary Tournament on July 11, 2021. He won the fight by a second-round knockout, as he stopped Yamato with low kicks.

Nakano was booked to face Masaya Jaki at Rise World Series 2021 Osaka 2 on November 14, 2021. He won the fight by a second-round technical knockout. He staggered Jaki with a left hook, before forcing a referee stoppage with a flurry of punches at the 2:16 minute mark.

Nakano faced Chansuk for the vacant S1 super lightweight title in the main event of NJKF 2022 west 1st on February 5, 2022. He won the fight by a third-round technical knockout.

RISE welterweight champion
Nakano faced Masashi Nakajima at RISE 156 on March 27, 2022 in a fight serving as the semi final for the vacant RISE welterweight championship tournament. He won the fight by unanimous decision. Nakano was next booked to face Ryoya Inai for the vacant title at RISE 158 on May 29, 2022. He won the fight by knockout in the second round to capture the vacant title.

Nakano faced Chadd Collins in a non-title bout at RISE WORLD SERIES 2022 Osaka on August 21, 2022. He lost the fight by a first-round knockout. Although Nakano was able to rise to his feet following a knockdown near the end of the opening round, he was visibly staggered, which prompted the referee to wave the fight off.

Championships and accomplishments
New Japan Kickboxing Federation
 2018 NJKF Welterweight (-67.5 kg) Championship
WBC Muaythai
 2021 WBC Muaythai Japan Welterweight (-67.5 kg) Championship
Onesongchai
 2019 S-1 Japan Super Lightweight (-65 kg) Championship
 2022 S-1 World Welterweight (-67 kg) Championship
RISE
 2022 RISE Welterweight (-67.5kg) Championship

Fight record

|-  style="text-align:center; background:#fbb"
| 2022-08-21 || Loss||align=left| Chadd Collins || RISE WORLD SERIES 2022 Osaka || Osaka, Japan || KO (Punches)||  1||2:43
|-  style="background:#cfc"
| 2022-05-29|| Win ||align=left| Ryoya Inai|| RISE 158 || Tokyo, Japan || KO (Punches)  || 2 || 1:39 
|-
! style=background:white colspan=9 |
|-  style="background:#cfc"
| 2022-03-27||Win ||align=left| Masashi Nakajima || RISE 156 || Tokyo, Japan || Decision (Unanimous)  || 3 || 3:00
|-
|-  style="background:#cfc"
| 2022-02-05||Win ||align=left| Chansuk VertexGym|| NJKF 2022 west 1st || Osaka, Japan || TKO  || 3 || 2:44
|-
! style=background:white colspan=9 |
|-
|-  style="background:#cfc"
| 2021-11-14 ||Win ||align=left| Masaya Jaki|| Rise World Series 2021 Osaka 2 || Osaka, Japan || TKO (Punches) || 2 || 2:56
|-
|-  style="background:#cfc"
| 2021-07-11||Win ||align=left| Yuya Yamato || Yamato Gym 50th Anniversary Tournament || Nagoya, Japan || KO (Right low kick) || 2 || 2:16
|-
! style=background:white colspan=9 |
|-
|-  style="background:#cfc"
| 2020-11-10||Win ||align=left| Hiroto Yamaguchi || RISE DEAD OR ALIVE 2020 Osaka || Osaka, Japan || KO (Right low kick) || 2 || 2:16
|-
|-  style="background:#fbb"
| 2020-02-23 || Loss ||align=left| Kosei Yamada || RISE 137 || Tokyo, Japan || Decision (Unanimous) || 3 || 3:00
|-
|-  style="background:#cfc"
| 2019-11-30 ||Win ||align=left| Hayato Hatakeyama || NJKF 2019 4th || Tokyo, Japan || TKO (Punches) || 2 || 2:01
|-
! style=background:white colspan=9 |
|-  style="background:#fbb"
| 2019-09-22 || Loss ||align=left| Kyung Jae Cho || NJKF 2019 West 4th || Osaka, Japan || Decision (Unanimous) || 3 || 3:00
|-
|-  style="background:#cfc"
| 2019-07-21||Win ||align=left| Yuya || RISE WORLD SERIES 2019 Semi-Final Round in OSAKA || Osaka, Japan || KO (Left hook) || 1 ||
|-
|-  style="background:#fbb"
| 2019-04-14|| Loss ||align=left| Pakorn P.K. Saenchai Muaythaigym || The Battle Of Muay Thai Season 2 vol.1 || Yokohama, Japan || KO (Right low kick) || 2 || 0:58
|-
|-  style="background:#cfc"
| 2018-12-16 ||Win ||align=left| TETSURO || NJKF 2018 West 4th || Osaka, Japan || Decision (Unanimous)|| 3 || 3:00
|-
! style=background:white colspan=9 |
|-
|-  style="background:#cfc"
| 2018-10-28 ||Win ||align=left| Kazuki Hamasaki || Hoost Cup Kings Osaka 3 || Osaka, Japan || TKO (Corner stoppage)|| 3 || 0:31
|-
|-  style="background:#cfc"
| 2018-07-19 ||Win ||align=left| Jun Da Lion || NJKF WEST Young Fight 4th || Osaka, Japan || Decision (Unanimous)|| 3 || 3:00
|-
|-  style="background:#cfc"
| 2018-05-27 ||Win ||align=left| Takaya Donhie || NJKF 2018 west 3rd || Osaka, Japan || KO || 3 || 2:33
|-
|-  style="background:#fbb"
| 2017-05-28 ||Loss||align=left| Vito Tofanelli || ING International Interleague Play || Tokyo, Japan || KO (Spinning wheel kick) || 2 || 2:37
|-
|-  style="background:#fbb"
| 2017-02-05||Loss||align=left| Katsuki Kitano || NJKF 2017 west 1st|| Tokyo, Japan || KO (Head kick) || 1 || 1:23
|-
|-  style="background:#cfc"
| 2016-11-20 ||Win ||align=left| Yosuke YAMATO || HOOST CUP KINGS NAGOYA II ~ REVOLUTION || Nagoya, Japan || KO (Right straight) || 1 || 1:47
|-
|-  style="background:#cfc"
| 2016-06-26 ||Win ||align=left| Tomoto Oishi || NJKF 2016 4th || Nagoya, Japan || TKO || 2 || 2:06
|-
|-  style="background:#cfc"
| 2015-12-19||Win ||align=left| Yuta Takahashi || MAT vol.1 || Tokyo, Japan || Decision (Majority) || 3 || 3:00
|-
|-  style="background:#cfc"
| 2015-11-01||Win ||align=left| SAMUEL || NJKF 2015 8th || Osaka, Japan || Decision (Split) || 3 || 3:00
|-
|-  style="background:#cfc"
| 2014-11-02||Win||align=left| Seiya Amano || NJKF 2014 7th || Osaka, Japan || Decision (Unanimous) || 3 || 3:00
|-  style="background:#cfc"
| 2013-09-15||Win||align=left| Kei Hachino || NJKF 2013 5th|| Osaka, Japan || Decision (Unanimous) || 3 || 3:00
|-
|-
| colspan=9 | Legend:

See also
 List of male kickboxers

References

Living people
1996 births
Japanese male kickboxers
Sportspeople from Osaka Prefecture